The Party of Labour of Austria (PdA) is a communist party in Austria. PdA was founded on 12 October 2013 by the Communist Initiative, a Marxist-Leninist breakaway faction of the Communist Party of Austria (KPÖ), who were dissatisfied with the party's ideological orientation.

History
Communist Initiative was an internal group in the Communist Party of Austria, founded in 2004 to promote Marxist-Leninist ideas in the party. The Initiative broke with the KPÖ in 2005, citing a lack of internal democracy.

PdA's founding conference was attended by delegates from the Communist Party of Greece (KKE), Hungarian Workers' Party (Munkáspárt), German Communist Party (DKP), Communist Party of the Workers of Spain (PCTE), and Communist Party of Turkey (TKP). The party has particularly close fraternal relations with the KKE. The founding conference was also attended by Yahima Martínez, the ambassador to Austria from Cuba.

Elections 
The PdA contested the elections for the Vienna City Council in 2015 in six different districts, namely Leopoldstadt, Favoriten, Simmering, Meidling, Ottakring and Donaustadt. All together the PdA gained 441 votes (between 0,1 and 0,18%). This was insufficient to gain a seat in any of the district councils. In 2020 the PdA only contested the Ottakring district, gaining 79 votes (0,21%).

Party chairpersons

References

External links
 (in German)

2013 establishments in Austria
Communist parties in Austria
Far-left politics in Austria
Eurosceptic parties in Austria
Political parties established in 2013
Political parties in Austria
International Meeting of Communist and Workers Parties